Verdalselva is a  long river in the municipality of Verdal in Trøndelag county, Norway.   The river begins at Holmen in the village of Vuku at the confluence of the rivers Inna and Helgåa.  The river Inna drains the lake Innsvatnet near the Swedish border and the river Helgåa runs from the lake Veresvatnet at the village of Vera.  The river Verdalselva flows west into the Trondheimsfjord, after passing through the town of Verdalsøra. The river Verdalselva is one of the country's best for salmon fishing.

See also
List of rivers in Norway

References

Verdal
Rivers of Trøndelag
Rivers of Norway